Yu Huiyong (1925–1977) was a Chinese artist and politician of the Communist Party of China and the People's Republic of China. He is known for the art he made of Mao Zhedong, the then-leader of China.

Biography
Yu Huiyong was born in Shandong Province in 1925. He was greatly interested in music and learned to play a variety of instruments such as the erhu, the sanxian, and the dizi. During the Second Sino-Japanese War, he joined a communist performance group, and in 1949 went to teach at the Shanghai Conservatory of Music (while simultaneously studying popular music), helping at turning a Western-oriented institution into a training ground for the communist art of People's China. In the meantime, he joined the Communist Party of China. He graduated in 1950 but continued to work in the field of music.

In the same year, Yu Huiyong was transferred to the Research Institute on Ethnic Music, where he wrote many essays on music styles in China's provinces and took part in creating orchestral performances. In later years, he continued teaching and writing, publishing a comprehensive essay on China's folk music in 1959. In 1962 he was promoted to lecturer at the Shanghai Conservatory, and deputy director of its musical theory department the following year. In 1965 he was appointed member of the Drama Reform and Creative Group, and worked on musical embellishment of Taking Tiger Mountain by Strategy, one of the "eight model revolutionary theatrical works" re-elaborated by Jiang Qing.

In 1966, when the Cultural Revolution broke out, Yu Huiyong and many of the Shanghai Conservatory staff were targeted as bourgeois intellectuals and forced to resign, submit to self-criticism and criticism by students, and do physical labor. Yu Huiyong however took active part at the movement: he was called to Beijing to stage the "eight model revolutionary theatrical works", then returned to Shanghai where he joined the "rebel faction". In 1967 he was appointed vice-chairman of the Shanghai Conservatory Revolutionary Committee, chairman of the preparatory committee for the Shanghai Cultural Revolutionary Committee, and put in charge of the Shanghai Peking Opera Theatre. He worked directly under Zhang Chunqiao, one of the Gang of Four.

Taking an ever more prominent role, in 1968 Yu Huiyong chaired the criticism meeting against He Luting, president of the Shanghai Conservatory of Music. In 1969 he participated to the CPC 9th National Congress and was appointed standing committee member of the Shanghai Municipal Revolutionary Committee.

In 1970 Yu Huiyong was transferred to Beijing to become a member of the Cultural Group Under the State Council of the People's Republic of China chaired by Wu De. He was in charge of following movie transposition of model operas like The Legend of the Red Lantern, Red Detachment of Women, etc. In 1973 he was elected member of the CPC Central Committee by the Party's 10th Congress, and also appointed deputy head of the Cultural Group; later he was promoted to Minister of Culture in 1975 as the post was re-established by the 1st Session of the 4th National People's Congress.

In the last stages of the Cultura Revolution, Yu Huiyong oversaw art production and anti-revisionist works in China, as the film Chunmiao (Spring Sprout), which was criticized by Deng Xiaoping as "ultra-leftist". All of this led him to be accused of being part of the Gang of Four plot, aspiring to be a vice-premier and CPC Politburo member. For that he was arrested in October 1976. He committed suicide in August 1977.

|-

1925 births
1977 deaths
Politicians from Weihai
People of the Cultural Revolution
People's Republic of China politicians from Shandong
Chinese Communist Party politicians from Shandong
Chinese revolutionaries
Anti-revisionists
Chinese politicians who committed suicide
Ministers of Culture of the People's Republic of China
Suicides in the People's Republic of China
Republic of China musicians
People's Republic of China musicians
Musicians from Shandong
Republic of China essayists
People's Republic of China essayists
Writers from Weihai
Expelled members of the Chinese Communist Party
20th-century essayists